In the United States, cursive handwriting instruction is provided to elementary school children in some schools, with cursive taught alongside standard handwriting. Due to multiple factors including stylistic choices and technological advancement, the use of cursive has quickly declined since the start of the 21st century.

Cursive has traditionally been used as a way of signing one's name, a signature.

No Child Left Behind
When the No Child Left Behind Act of 2001 was implemented, several changes were made to the classroom curriculum. One of those changes, which has been frequently altered, is the requirement for cursive handwriting. The U.S. Department of Education has provided updates of the changes as they are implemented by school systems. The general curriculum states that by 5th grade, students should use cursive exclusively.

Recent events 
Many United States schools have removed cursive handwriting instruction from their curriculum. When the system was revisited after the skill was taken out of the core requirements, school therapists reported that some students struggled with manuscript but excelled in cursive writing. Many schools have adopted keyboarding as an alternative to cursive handwriting instruction.

In a 2022 article in The Atlantic, historian and former Harvard University president Drew Gilpin Faust claimed that the Gen Z never learned to read and write cursive.

References 

Education in the United States by subject